The Galician Unions Confederacy is a trade union in  that was created after the merge of two previous unions: the INTG and the CXTG. It has a Galician nationalist and socialist ideology and generally defends a combative labour model, as opposed to the perceived mild tactics of the other two main unions in Galicia, CCOO and the UGT. The union has organized 6 general strikes in Galicia since its creation.

Currently the CIG has 4,480 labour delegates (28.28% of the total) and more than 80,000 members, being the largest union in Galicia both in membership and delegates.

References

External links
  CIG official site.

Trade unions in Spain
1993 establishments in Spain
National trade union centers of Spain
European Trade Union Confederation
Trade unions established in 1993
Socialism
Galician nationalism
Galician Nationalist Bloc